Metarctia metaleuca is a moth of the subfamily Arctiinae. It was described by George Hampson in 1914. It is found in Kenya, Liberia and Uganda.

References

 

Metarctia
Moths described in 1914